Ray Donovan is an American crime drama television series created by Ann Biderman, which premiered on Showtime on June 30, 2013. Liev Schreiber stars as the titular character, a "fixer" for the powerful law firm Goldman & Drexler, representing the rich and famous of Los Angeles, California. Ray experiences his own problems when his father, Mickey Donovan (Jon Voight), is unexpectedly released from prison.

On February 4, 2020, Showtime cancelled the series after seven seasons. However, on February 24, 2021, the network announced a feature-length film to conclude the storyline, set to premiere in 2022.

Series overview

Episodes

Season 1 (2013)

Season 2 (2014)

Season 3 (2015)

Season 4 (2016)

Season 5 (2017)

Season 6 (2018–19)

Season 7 (2019–20)

Ratings

References

External links 
 
 

Ray Donovan